Sonia Dada was an American rock, soul, and rhythm and blues band, formed in Chicago in 1990. Founding member Daniel Pritzker enlisted Michael Scott, Paris Delane, and Sam Hogan after hearing the latter three sing in a subway station. Sonia Dada has become a mainstay of the Chicago musical scene in the years since, incorporating elements of rock, soul, gospel, and funk.

Their 1992 debut album, Sonia Dada, produced a major radio hit, "You Don't Treat Me No Good", and sold more than 100,000 copies. The album peaked at #29 on Billboard'''s Heatseekers chart in 1993. In 1994, the band's tour saw them opening for the group Traffic, as well as headlining an extremely successful Australian tour. The album reached #1 on the Australian ARIA charts and was the #13 highest selling album for the year of 1993. The single "You Don't Treat Me No Good" spent four weeks at number one on the ARIA singles chart and was the #3 highest selling single for the same year, while "You Ain't Thinking (About Me)" was the #40 highest selling single. However, they are known primarily as a one-hit wonder in Australia. On the Australian ARIA charts "You Aint Thinking (About Me)" reached #3.

Since then, Sonia Dada has released four studio albums and a live album. Their 2004 release, Test Pattern'', was released in a deluxe edition with a bonus DVD containing short films by Jeth Weinrich.

Members
Daniel Pritzker – guitar
Michael Scott – vocals
Paris Delane – vocals
Sam Hogan – vocals
Shawn Christopher  – vocals
Dave Resnik – guitar
Phil Miller – guitar
Erik Scott – bass
Hank Guaglianone – drums
Larry Beers – drums
Chris "Hambone" Cameron – keyboards
Ron Schwartz – keyboards & production
Scott Steiner – audio engineer

Discography

Studio albums

Live albums

Singles

References

External links
Official website

American rhythm and blues musical groups
Musical groups from Chicago
Musical groups established in 1990
Capricorn Records artists